Kieran Long  is a British journalist and curator specializing in architecture and design.  Long has been a presenter in a number of television shows.

Career 
Long graduated from Cardiff University in 1998 with a degree in English literature.

Long has undertaken a number of journalism roles, including deputy editor of Icon magazine 2003–2006 and editor in chief of the Architects' Journal and the Architectural Review 2007–2009. Long was also the architecture critic for the London Evening Standard newspaper 2010–2014. His television work includes presenting 'Restoration Home' and 'The House That £100k Built' for the BBC.

Long was assistant director to David Chipperfield at the 2012 Venice Biennale of Architecture. He was senior curator at the department of design, architecture and digital at the Victoria and Albert Museum (V&A) 2013–2014 and was the keeper of the department from 2014 to April 2017.

, Long is the Director of ArkDes, The (state-run) Swedish Center for Architecture and Design, in Stockholm.

According to interviews in Swedish media, Long has received internal criticism of his leadership. Dagens Nyheter reported that 37 employees have resigned from ArkDes since Long became director in 2017, that number is equal to the total number of employees at ArkDes. The local head of the union DIK confirmed to DN that many left due to dissatisfaction with the leadership. 

One of Kieran Long's most important contributions in his role as director of ArkDes is the exhibition and the book about the architect Sigurd Lewerentz, both with the title "Sigurd Lewerentz Architect of Death and Life". The book takes its starting point from the ArkDes collection and the results of the main authors Johan Örn and Mikael Andersson's many years of research.

He is married to Swedish designer Sofia Lagerkvist.

Works 
New London Interiors, 2004
Hatch: The New Architectural Generation, 2008

References 

Living people
British curators
British magazine editors
Year of birth missing (living people)